Wanderer Valley is a valley in central Bird Island, South Georgia. The valley extends northeast for 0.5 nautical miles (0.9 km) from the head of Freshwater Inlet. It was named by the United Kingdom Antarctic Place-Names Committee (UK-APC) after the wandering albatross (Diomedea exulans) whose principal breeding grounds are nearby.

Valleys of Antarctica